Ragusa (1960–1973) was an Irish Thoroughbred racehorse.

Background
Ragusa was a bay horse bred by Harry Frank Guggenheim. He was sired by Ribot, who was standing in Italy when Guggenheim sent his mare Fantan to be covered in 1959. The mare proved very difficult to get "in foal" and did not conceive until 15 June, well after the usual breeding season had finished. Ragusa was a small and weak foal who needed to be hand fed on milk and eggs, and Guggenheim decided to sell him. At the Ballsbridge Sales in September 1961, Ragusa was sold for 3,800 guineas, to Paddy Prendergast on behalf of James R. Mullion and Meg Mullion of the Ardenode stud in County Kildare, Ireland.

Racing career

1962: two-year-old season
Ragusa made his first racecourse appearance in October 1962 at the Curragh where he won the Suir Maiden Plate over seven furlongs.

1963: three-year-old season
On his first appearance of the 1963 season, Ragusa was sent to England, where he started favourite for the Dee Stakes at Chester Racecourse but finished second to My Myosotis. In June, he started a 25/1 outsider for the Derby at Epsom and exceeded expectations by finishing third of the twenty-six runners behind Relko and Merchant Venturer.

At the Curragh later that month, Ragusa won the Irish Derby by two and a half lengths after Relko was withdrawn at the start. In July, Ragusa started at odds of 4/1 in a field of ten runners for Britain's most prestigious all-aged race, he King George VI and Queen Elizabeth Stakes at Ascot. He won by four lengths from the four-year-old Miralgo. At York Racecourse in August, he defeated the 2000 Guineas winner Only for Life in the Great Voltigeur Stakes at odds of 2/5. At Doncaster Racecourse in September, Ragusa started the 2/5 favourite for the St Leger and won in a canter by six lengths.

1964: four-year-old season
Ragusa began his third season by winning the Ardenode Stakes at Naas, then ran third in the Royal Whip Stakes at the Curragh. In July, he returned to England and won the Eclipse Stakes by one and a half lengths from Baldric. On his final racecourse appearance, he finished unplaced in the Prix de l'Arc de Triomphe.

Stud career
Ragusa was retired from racing to become a breeding stallion in Ireland. The best of his progeny included Morston, Ragstone, Caliban (Coronation Cup), and Homeric. Ragusa died in 1973.

Pedigree

References

1960 racehorse births
1973 racehorse deaths
Racehorses bred in Ireland
Racehorses trained in Ireland
Irish Classic Race winners
Thoroughbred family 9
St Leger winners
King George VI and Queen Elizabeth Stakes winners